Gleichberge was a Verwaltungsgemeinschaft ("collective municipality") in the district of Hildburghausen, in Thuringia, Germany. It was disbanded on 31 December 2012. The seat of the Verwaltungsgemeinschaft was in Römhild.

The Verwaltungsgemeinschaft Gleichberge consisted of the following municipalities:
Haina 
Mendhausen 
Milz 
Römhild
Westenfeld

Former Verwaltungsgemeinschaften in Thuringia